La Pocita de las Golondrinas Beach is a small public and natural saltwater beach in Isabela. It is safe for families with children because of its shallow waters (about two feet deep) and lacks entries to the open sea. It is located about five minutes to the right of Montones Beach. Currently this beach does not have facilities. Still, it is surrounded by food kiosks and there are parking lots in walking distance.

Location 

It may be reached using PR-466 street in Isabela.

What can be done

Swimming Limited shallow waters allow a safe environment for swimmers and non swimmers alike. Water is warm, only about two feet deep.
Sun Bathing: Excellent conditions year round.
Snorkeling: There are reefs, urchins, many fish and other marine wildlife.
Sunset: Since located on west side of Puerto Rico the possibilities are greater of an amazing sunset.
Hotels: There are hotels nearby.

Facilities 

Food: There are kiosks nearby with traditional fried foods such as pastelillos / empanadillas.
Lifeguards: No Lifeguards available.
Bathroom facilities: There are no bathroom facilities at the beach, but across the street there are restaurants and kiosks with restrooms.
Parking: There is a parking lot in walking distance. There is also a spot for parking right on the sand along the street.

See also

Flamenco Beach
Crash Boat Beach
List of beaches in Puerto Rico
Puerto Rico Tourism Company

References

External links 
Isabela Weather at Weather Channel
La Pocita de las Golondrinas Beach at Wikimapia
La Poza de Teodoro(also known as La Pocita de las Golondrinas) Reviews at Yelp! 
Getting from San Juan Airport to La Pocita de las Golondrinas at Mapquest

Beaches of Puerto Rico
Isabela, Puerto Rico